Borsalino is the oldest Italian company specializing in the manufacture of luxury hats. Since 1857, the manufacture has been based in Alessandria, Piedmont. The founder, Giuseppe Borsalino, is remembered for creating a particular model of felt hat characterized by the registered trademark Borsalino.

History
On 4 April 1857, Giuseppe Borsalino started a workshop in Alessandria that specialized in the production of felt hats. The workshop eventually grew to industrial production, and in 1888 the company moved to a new factory designed by Arnaldo Gardella, located on Corso Cento Cannoni, Alessandria. In these years Borsalino produced 2,500 hats a day, but when the company won the Grand Prix, an important quality certificate, at the Paris Exposition Universelle in 1900, spread the brand's fame globally. The succession of Giuseppe Borsalino was complicated: the designated heir, Teresio Borsalino, was opposed to his cousin Giovanni Borsalino, son of Lazzaro, who inaugurated a new hat factory using the family name. Between Borsalino Antica Casa and Borsalino Fu Lazzaro were years of hard commercial battles but in the end the Teresio came out and the name Borsalino became one again.

On the eve of the First World War Borsalino produced about 2,000,000 hats annually. The manufacture employed over 2,500 employees, representing a significant resource in the economy of the Piedmontese city. Abroad, the brand spread everywhere, conquering the most important markets: the British, but especially the US, where the hats produced in Alessandria were adopted by the Hollywood starsystem.

The downsizing of the company occurred in 1950 in conjunction with the beginning of the fall into disuse of formal hats: Borsalino is thus transformed from mass product into a cult object. In 1987 the hat factory moved from the historic center in Alessandria to the current one of Spinetta Marengo, in the suburbs of the city, and the president Vittorio Vaccarino, the last descendant of the Borsalino family, sold the company to a group of Milanese entrepreneurs.

In the nineties the company changed ownership several times to be finally bought by the entrepreneur Marco Marenco, involved in a €3.5 billion financial crack. 
On 18 December 2017 the Court of Alessandria declared the bankruptcy of Borsalino Giuseppe and Fratello Spa.
Haeres Equita, a private equity fund which manages the brand's activities since 2016, confirms the will to continue the production, the distribution and the promoting activities of the forthcoming collections, keeping all employments and maintaining the production site in Alessandria (Piedmont). In 2017, on the occasion of the 160th anniversary of the company, the Italian Ministry of Economic Development recognized Borsalino as one of the 'Excellencies of the production system', dedicating it a stamp worth €0.95. On 12 July 2018, the company was sold in a court auction for 6.4 million euros ($7.4 million) to Haeres Equita.

Production
Borsalino manufacturing has remained faithful to a production process that represents the cultural values of the company, handed down from generation to generation. 
The hats continue to be produced in Alessandria by combining industrial technology and the spirit craftsmanship. The felt models, created from fur fibers, require more than 50 manual steps and seven weeks of work to create; the straw models, which are hand twisted, can take up to 6 months for a single hat.

Borsalino and Alessandria
The Borsalino business dynasty has made an important contribution to the city of Alessandria, building the aqueduct, the sewerage network, hospital, sanatorium and retirement home. The historic headquarters of the company, currently located in Corso 100 Cannoni, now hosts the University of Eastern Piedmont Amedeo Avogadro and the Borsalino Hat Museum. 
In 2016, independent film director Enrica Viola dedicated a documentary to the relationship between Borsalino and Alessandria: Borsalino City was presented at film festivals in Turin, Barcelona and Melbourne.

The Borsalino Hat Museum
In the spring of 2006, the Borsalino Hat Museum opened in the company's historical headquarters in Corso 100 Cannoni, Alessandria. A joint initiative by Alessandria town council and the Borsalino company, the museum covers an exhibition area of 400 m2 and houses about two thousand hats, displayed in the historic Chippendale style cabinets made in the 1920s by Arnaldo Gardella for the factory sample room. In 2018, the museum is planning to move to a larger venue with a completely renovated exhibition.

In Orthodox Jewish communities
Among Orthodox Jewish men and boys, covering the head is an identifier of religiousity. Many men in strictly Orthodox Jewish communities wear a black, wide-brimmed Borsalino hat.
See .

In popular culture

Borsalino and art
The relationship between Borsalino and the art world has ancient origins. Since the birth of advertising in Italy, at the turn of the late nineteenth and early twentieth century, Borsalino has entrusted the realization of its posters to the most important artists of the time. This privileged relationship with art has been confirmed over time and has led the company to collaborate with Cesare Simonetti, Giorgio Muggiani, Giovanni Dradi, Franz Laskoff, Marcello Dudovich, winner in 1910 of a competition organized by Borsalino to publicize the Zenit hat, Giuseppe Minonzio, Gino Boccasile, Luigi Bompard, Jeanne Grignani, Luigi Veronesi, Max Huber and Armando Testa. Today the antique Borsalino advertising posters are collector items that have been beaten in the most important auction houses in the world.

Borsalino and theatre
In Arthur Miller's play The Price, character Solomon regrets that his hat is not a Borsalino, in spite of looking so.

Borsalino and cinema
Borsalino has a long-running and special bond with the film industry. One picture stands out above all: Humphrey Bogart and Ingrid Bergman in the unforgettable final scene of Casablanca. The relationship with the cinema was destined to last: in addition to Bogart and Bergman in Casablanca, Marcello Mastroianni in 8 ½ and Jean Paul Belmondo in Breathless both wore a Borsalino.

Above all, the Alessandria factory granted the use of its name to two cult films of the 1970s: Borsalino and Borsalino & Co.. The idea was Alain Delon's, and Borsalino accepted on the condition that the company logo would appear on the posters. The Italian company was the first luxury brand to give its name to two films.

Even Robert De Niro in Once Upon a Time in America (1984) wears Borsalino hats.

In 2011, the Triennale Design Museum in Milan hosted an exhibition entitled "Il cinema con il cappello. Borsalino e altre storie".

The actor Toni Servillo wears a Borsalino in the film The Great Beauty, which won Best Foreign Language Film at the 86th Academy Awards.

In 2018, Borsalino celebrates its deep and lasting relationship with the world of cinema by introducing The Bogart by Borsalino, a special collection dedicated to Humphrey Bogart, the great Hollywood actor. The hats collection is created in collaboration with Humphrey Bogart Estate.

In the TV show “Shantaram”, a secondary but recurring character in season 1, episode 5, titled “ The Sin in the Crime", uses a metaphor about the quality of a Borsalino hat to describe the main character’s (Lin Ford, played  by Charlie Hunnam) relationship with the city of Bombay, India (the city of Mumbai is called Bombay in the show).

Borsalino and design
In 2009, Borsalino was included by the Triennale Design Museum in Milan among quintessential Italian icons in the 'Serie Fuori Serie' exhibition. The exhibition was replicated in March 2017 at the National Museum of China in Beijing.

The Chapeau Lamp (2014) designed by Philippe Starck for Flos and the sculpture The Hatband(2016) by Moritz Waldemeyer are both tributes to Borsalino.

Borsalino and fashion
Borsalino has been collaborating with some of the most important names in the fashion system since the beginning of the millennium. These have led to the creation of capsule collections with Nick Fouquet, Tom Ford, Gianni Versace, Krizia, Valentino, Moschino, Yohji Yamamoto, Marni, Gianfranco Ferré, Rochas, Italia Independent and DSquared.

See also

 Fedora
 Boss of the Plains
 Homburg (hat)
 Pork pie hat
 Stetson
 Trench coat
 Trilby
 Tyrolean hat
 List of headgear
 Cap

References

External links 

 Borsalino website

Hat companies
Clothing brands of Italy
Clothing companies established in 1857
Italian companies established in 1857
High fashion brands
Luxury brands
Haute couture
Alessandria

fr:Borsalino (chapeau)